Sagar Island is an island in the Ganges delta, lying on the Continental Shelf of Bay of Bengal about 100 km (54 nautical miles) south of Kolkata. This island forms the Sagar CD Block in Kakdwip subdivision of South 24 Parganas district in the Indian State of West Bengal. Although Sagar Island is a part of Sundarbans, it does not have any tiger habitation or mangrove forests or small river tributaries as is characteristic of the overall Sundarban delta. This island is a place of Hindu pilgrimage. Every year on the day of Makar Sankranti (14 January), hundreds of thousands of Hindus gather to take a holy dip at the confluence of river Ganges and Bay of Bengal and offer prayers (puja) in the Kapil Muni Temple. Kolkata Port Trust has a pilot station and a light house.

Geography

Location

Climate

History

A holy man, Kardam Muni, made a pact with Vishnu that he would undergo the rigours of marital life, on the condition that Vishnu would incarnate as his son.  In due time Kapil Muni was born as an incarnation of Vishnu and became a great saint. Kapil Muni's ashram was located on the island. One day King Sagar's sacrificial horse disappeared; it had been stolen by Indra.

The king sent his 60,000 sons to find it, and they found it next to Kapil Muni's ashram, where Indra had hidden it. Mistaking Kapil Muni for the thief, the sons accused Kapil Muni, who in his wrath at the false accusation burned the sons to ash and sent their souls to Hell. Later having compassion for the King Sagar's sons, Kapil Muni acceded to the prayers of King Sagar's descendants, agreeing to the restoration of the sons, if Parvati in the form of the river goddess Ganga would descend to Earth to perform the Last Ritual (Hindus also called as"Tarpan") of mixing the ashes with holy water (niravapanjali).

Through deep meditation, King Bhagiratha induced Shiva to order Ganga down from heaven and the 60,000 sons were freed (moksha) and ascended to Heaven, but the river Ganges stayed on the Earth. The date of the descent of Ganga was the date, as is at present the 15th Day of January of the Gregorian Calendar which coincides with that of Makar Sankranti (when Surya enters Makar Constellation, i.e. "Uttarayan" of Hindu Panchangam).

Demographics
As per 2011 Census of India, Sagar Island had a total population of 212,037, of which 109,468 (52%) were males and 102,569 (48%) were females. Population below 6 years was 26,212. The total number of literates was 156,476 (84.21% of the population over 6 years).

Pilgrimage

The Gangasagar fair and pilgrimage is held annually on Sagar Island's southern tip, where the Ganges enters the Bay of Bengal. This confluence is also called Gangasagar or Gangasagara. Near the confluence is the Kapil Muni Temple. The Gangasagar pilgrimage and fair is the second largest congregation of mankind after the triennial ritual bathing of Kumbha Mela.

In 2007, about 300,000 pilgrims took the holy dip where the Hooghly meets the Bay of Bengal on the occasion of Makar Sankranti. Almost five-hundred thousand pilgrims thronged Sagar Island in 2008. For the rest of the year about 500,000 people come to the island. According to reports on 14 January 2018, 18-2 million people had visited Ganga Sagar in 2018, against 1.5 million in 2017.

Travel

From Kolkata, Diamond Harbour Road (NH-12) runs south around 90 km to Harwood Point, near Kakdwip, where a ferry runs to Kachuberia at the north end of the island. The Panchyat Samity maintains a parking area near the ferry landing. The ferry travels about 3.5 km across a distributary of the Ganges river (also known as Hooghly River or Muriganga river locally) to reach Kachuberia. Small boats also cross from Harwood Point to Kachuberia. Private cars and buses travel the roughly 32 km to the pilgrimage site at Sagardwip. From the pilgrimage parking area the Kapil Muni Temple is about 200 meters and the Gangasagar confluence is about 700 meters.

Development proposals
The Government of India and  Government of West Bengal are planning to connect Sagar Island with Kakdwip with a 3.3km rail-and-road bridge and to build Sagar Port on Sagar Island.

References

External links
 

 
 

Islands of West Bengal
Islands of the Bay of Bengal
Geography of South 24 Parganas district
Sundarbans
Hindu pilgrimage sites in India
Tourist attractions in South 24 Parganas district
Populated places in India